Rhododendron State Park is a public recreation area and nature preserve occupying  on and around Little Monadnock Mountain in Fitzwilliam, New Hampshire, United States. The state park contains a  stand of native Rhododendron maximum, the largest of nineteen similar stands in central and northern New England, the northern limit of their growing range. The stand was designated a National Natural Landmark in 1982. The park also includes wild blueberries, cranberries, mountain laurel, heathers, mayflower, and wintergreen.

History
In 1901-1902 Mary Lee Ware played a pivotal role in the creation of the park. In 1901, landowner Levi Fuller planned to "lumber off" the property and would have if not for Mary, who bought it in 1902. Giving it to the Appalachian Mountain Club (AMC) a year later, she signed the deal on the condition that the woodland "...be held as a reservation properly protected and open to the public..."  The contract barred cutting down any trees or picking any rhododendron, a promise that has been broken only once due to the 1938 hurricane.

The donated land is called "Old Patch Place," remodeled by the AMC as a hostel/clubhouse but has since 1946 come under the protection of the N.H. Division of Parks and Recreation — the system's only designated botanical park. The Old Patch Place cottage near the park entrance was listed on the National Register of Historic Places in 1980.

Activities and amenities
The rhododendrons bloom in mid-July. The park is open year-round. Hiking, picnicking, and snowshoeing are available. The Metacomet-Monadnock Trail passes through the state park on the way to the summit of Little Monadnock Mountain, which is outside the park limits.

See also

National Register of Historic Places listings in Cheshire County, New Hampshire
List of National Natural Landmarks in New Hampshire

References

Other reading
 Southern New Hampshire Trail Guide. The Appalachian Mountain Club, Boston, 1999.
 The Metacomet-Monadnock Trail Guide. 9th Edition. The Appalachian Mountain Club. Amherst, Massachusetts, 1999

External links
Rhododendron State Park New Hampshire Department of Natural and Cultural Resources
Rhododendron State Park Trail Map New Hampshire Department of Natural and Cultural Resources

State parks of New Hampshire
State parks of the Appalachians
Botanical gardens in New Hampshire
National Natural Landmarks in New Hampshire
Parks in Cheshire County, New Hampshire
Fitzwilliam, New Hampshire
Appalachian Mountain Club
Protected areas established in 1947
1947 establishments in New Hampshire